Dick Lane may refer to:

Sportspeople
 Night Train Lane (1927–2002), American football player
 Dick Lane (baseball) (1927–2018), American baseball player
 Dick Lane (pool player), pocket billiards player

Other people
 Richard Douglas Lane (1936–2002), known as Dick Lane, scholar, author, collector and dealer in Japanese art
 Dick Lane (announcer) (1899–1982), television announcer
 Dick Lane (American politician) (1927–2015)

See also
 Dick Lane Velodrome, Atlanta
 Richard Lane (disambiguation)